Alexandre was ordered as a third-rank, 90-gun sailing  for the French Navy, but was converted to a steam-powered ship in the 1850s while under construction. Completed in 1857 the ship participated in the Second Italian War of Independence two years later. Her engines were removed in 1871 and she began conversion into a transport for exiled prisoners. Alexandre was instead completed as a gunnery training ship in 1872. She was hulked in 1877 and served as a barracks ship until she was scrapped in 1900.

Description
The Suffren-class ships were enlarged versions of the 80-gun  ships of the line that had been designed by naval architect Jacques-Noël Sané. The conversion to steam power involved cutting the ship's frame in half amidships and building a new section to house the propulsion machinery and coal bunkers, which reduced her armament to 90 guns. Her crew numbered 913 officers and ratings. Details are lacking on the ship's propulsion machinery, the only information available is that her two steam engines were rated at 900 nominal horsepower and produced .

The ship's consisted of eighteen 36-pounder smoothbore cannon and sixteen  Paixhans guns on the lower gundeck and thirty-four 30-pounder  cannon on the upper gundeck. On the quarterdeck and forecastle were twenty 30-pounder cannon and a pair of  rifled muzzle-loading guns.

Construction and career
Alexandre was one of the three ships of the second batch of Suffren-class ships of the line. She was laid down at the Arsenal de Rochefort on 30 May 1848 and was ordered to be converted to steam power on 19 October 1854. The conversion began on 28 April 1856 and the ship was launched on 23 March 1857. Alexandre was commissioned on 1 March although her sea trials did not begin until 14 April 1858. She was used as a hulk in Toulon from 1877, and broken up in 1900.

Citations

References

Ships of the line of the French Navy
Ships built in France
1857 ships
Crimean War naval ships of France
Suffren-class ships of the line